Desmond John Chetwode Crawley, CMG CVO (2 June 1917 – 26 April 1993) was a British diplomat, who served as administrator under the Raj to Commonwealth diplomat, from the Asian sub-continent to West Africa, and, finally, from behind the Iron Curtain to the Vatican.

He was educated at King's School, Ely and Queen's College, Oxford. He entered the Indian Civil Service in 1939 and served in the Madras Presidency. When India became independent in 1947 he entered the Commonwealth Relations Office in London. He served in Calcutta and  Washington, and was Principal Private Secretary to the Secretary of State for Commonwealth Relations 1952-1953. Crawley was Deputy High Commissioner in Lahore, Pakistan, 1958–61; attended the Imperial Defence College in   1962; was British High Commissioner in Sierra Leone 1963–66 and Ambassador to Bulgaria 1966–70; and finally was Envoy Extraordinary and Minister Plenipotentiary to the Holy See from 1970–75.

He was made a Knight Grand Cross of the Order of St Gregory the Great in 1973.

See also
British Ambassadors to the Holy See.

References

External links
CRAWLEY, Desmond John Chetwode, Who Was Who, A & C Black, 1920–2008; online edn, Oxford University Press, Dec 2007, accessed 16 February 2012

1917 births
1993 deaths
People educated at King's Ely
Alumni of The Queen's College, Oxford
High Commissioners of the United Kingdom to Sierra Leone
Ambassadors of the United Kingdom to Bulgaria
Ambassadors of the United Kingdom to the Holy See
Knights Grand Cross of the Order of St Gregory the Great
Place of birth missing
Place of death missing
British expatriates in Pakistan
Civil servants in the Commonwealth Relations Office